The 2018 PSL Beach Volleyball Challenge Cup was the second conference of the Philippine Super Liga's sixth season. The tournament was held at the Sands SM By the Bay, Mall of Asia Complex, Pasay from May 23–27, 2018.

Women's

Preliminary round

Pool A

|}

|}

Pool B

|}

|}

Pool C

|}

|}

Pool D

|}

|}

Playoffs

Quarterfinals

|}

|}

For 7th place

|}

For 5th place

|}

For 3rd place

|}

Women's Finals

|}

Final standing

Men's

Preliminary round

Pool A

|}

|}

Pool B

|}

|}

Playoffs

Semi-finals

|}

For 3rd place

|}

Men's Finals

|}

Final standing

Celebrity match

Team Tyang (TYA):
 Aby Maraño
 Abby Poblador
 Yamyam Soy

Team Iumi (IUM):
 Iumi Yongco
 Mich del Carmen
 Troy Montero

Team Jheck (JHE):
 Jheck Dionela
 Stephanie Dods
 KC Montero

Team Buday (BUD):
 Rachel Anne Daquis
 Amanda Fernandez
 Will Devaughn

|}

Venue
 The Sands (SM By The Bay, SM Mall of Asia)

Broadcast partners
ESPN 5: AksyonTV, Hyper (SD and HD), ESPN5.com

References

Beach Volleyball
Beach volleyball competitions in the Philippines
PSL